Jemulpo Station is a railway station of Seoul Subway Line 1 operated by Korail in Incheon, South Korea.

History
 1957: Station was firstly introduced under the name of Sungui station (숭의역)
 July 1959: Changed name to Jemulpo.
 In 2007, the plan to rebuild the station was announced.

Vicinity

Exit 1: Sunin High School
Exit 2: Sung'ui Elementary School

The Jemulpo Campus of the University of Incheon is nearby.

The JEI University is nearby.

References

Seoul Metropolitan Subway stations
Metro stations in Incheon
Railway stations opened in 1957
Michuhol District